"How to Tame Lions" is a song by Australian musician Washington, released in October as the second and final single from the EP of the same name. It is also inlaced on her debut studio album, I Believe You Liar (2010). Sales toward the song counted toward the EP, which peaked at number 73 on the ARIA charts.

In December 2009, the song won first place in the inaugural Vanda & Young Global Songwriting Competition.

At the ARIA Music Awards of 2010, the song was nominated for Single of the Year.

It was released in the United Kingdom in 2011 as a promotional single for the album, I Believe You Liar.

Music video
The music video was released on 12 October 2009.

References

2009 singles
2009 songs
Mercury Records singles
Megan Washington songs
Songs written by Megan Washington
Vanda & Young Global Songwriting Competition Winning Songs